Jena Michelle Sims (born December 30, 1988) is an American actress who has appeared in made-for-TV films and B movies like Attack of the 50 Foot Cheerleader (2012), 3-Headed Shark Attack (2015) and Sharknado 5: Global Swarming (2017). She was Miss Georgia Teen USA in 2007. She is married to the former world number one professional golfer Brooks Koepka.

Early life and education
Sims grew up in Winder, Georgia and graduated from Winder-Barrow High School in 2007. She briefly attended Belmont University in Nashville, Tennessee, where she studied International Business.

Career

Pageantry
In 2004, Sims was crowned Miss Georgia Junior National Teenager and later won the Miss Junior National Teenager title 2005. A year later, Sims won the Miss Georgia Teen USA 2007 title in a state pageant held in Newnan on November 11, 2006. Sims represented Georgia in the Miss Teen USA 2007 pageant in Pasadena, California in August 2007, but did not place. She was the first Miss Georgia Teen USA not to place in the pageant since 2003.

Acting
Sims has starred in Attack of the 50 Foot Cheerleader (2012), and has appeared in an episode of television series Entourage. She also appeared in Sharknado 5 in August 2017.

Pageant of Hope 
Sims runs a non-profit organisation that hosts beauty pageants for children with cancer and other disadvantages called the Pageant of Hope.  The pageants have been held in Georgia, Tennessee, New York, Michigan, Wisconsin, California.

Personal life
On April 1, 2021, Sims announced on Instagram that she was engaged to PGA Tour golfer Brooks Koepka. They were married on June 4, 2022 in the Turks and Caicos.

Sims co-owns a house with her mother, named "Beach Blanket" in Exuma, Bahamas that she rents as a vacation rental.

Filmography
 Attack of the 50 Foot Cheerleader as Cassie Stratford (2012)
 Last Vegas as Dean's Girl (2013)
 Kill the Messenger as Quail's Girlfriend (2014)
 3-Headed Shark Attack as Dr. Laura Thomas (2015)
 American Beach House as Lola (2015)

References

External links

  official website
 

1988 births
Belmont University alumni
Living people
2007 beauty pageant contestants
21st-century Miss Teen USA delegates
People from Winder, Georgia